The Fairytaler is a 2002 Danish animated television series based on the fairy tales of Hans Christian Andersen. and It was also the second anthology series adapted from Hans Christian Andersen's works right after Andersen Stories ended.

An English dub was eventually produced in later years.

List of episodes
 The Little Mermaid
 The Emperor's New Clothes
 The Nightingale
 The Tinderbox
 The Ugly Duckling
 The Wild Swans
 The Hardy Tin Soldier
 The Travelling Companion
 The Swineherd
 The Flying Trunk
 The Beetle
 What the Old Man Does is Right
 The Galoshes of Fortune
 The Golden Treasure
 The Professor and the Flea
 The Fir-Tree
 The Snow Queen, Part 1
 The Snow Queen, Part 2
 The Snowman (half-long episode)
 The Bottleneck
 Thumbelina
 The Jumper (half-long episode)
 Jack The Fool
 It's Quite True (half-long episode)
 Ollie Shuteye (half-long episode)
 The Lovers (half-long episode)
 Little Ida's Flowers (half-long episode)
 The Princess and the Pea (half-long episode)
 The Gardener and the Family (half-long episode)
 Sausage Peg Soup (half-long episode)
 The Old Street Lamp (half-long episode)

Broadcast
Toonavision began broadcasting the series in Canada in 2022.

References

External links

2002 Danish television series debuts
2003 Danish television series endings
Danish children's animated anthology television series
Danish children's animated fantasy television series
Television shows based on works by Hans Christian Andersen
1990s Danish television series
2000s British animated television series
1990s British animated television series
Danish-language television shows
Witchcraft in television
Cultural depictions of Hans Christian Andersen
Television shows based on fairy tales